The Lobero Theatre is an  historic building in Santa Barbara, California. The theater was originally built as an opera house, in a refurbished adobe school building, by Italian immigrant José Lobero in 1873. Located downtown at the corner of Anacapa and Canon Perdido streets, the Lobero Theatre is registered as a California Historical Landmark.

History
The Lobero was founded in 1873. By the early 1920s, the old opera house was becoming dilapidated and was rebuilt as a theater, to Spanish Colonial Revival style designs by architects George Washington Smith and Lutah Maria Riggs. The client was the Drama Branch of the Community Arts Association. The Lobero Theater opened in August 1924, during a period in which civic groups in Santa Barbara were beginning to unify the town's architectural look around a Spanish Colonial style.

Present day
The theatre continues to host arts and cultural events on 250 or more days per year. Because of its live acoustics and relatively small size it is particularly suited to chamber music. The Music Academy of the West holds many of its summer concerts in the Lobero.

See also
 History of Santa Barbara, California
California Historical Landmarks in Santa Barbara County, California

External links
Lobero Theater Records, at the University of California, Santa Barbara Library.

References

History of Santa Barbara County, California
Buildings and structures in Santa Barbara, California
Landmarks in California
Tourist attractions in Santa Barbara, California
Spanish Colonial Revival architecture in California
Theatres in California
Event venues established in 1873